The 1973–74 RFU Knockout Cup was the third edition of England's premier rugby union club competition at the time.  Coventry won the competition for the second successive year defeating London Scottish in the final. The final was held at Twickenham Stadium.

Draw and results

Second round

Quarter-finals

Semi-finals

Final

References

1973–74 rugby union tournaments for clubs
1973–74 in English rugby union
RFU Knockout Cup